National Highway 227F, commonly referred to as NH 227F is a national highway in Mehsi, India. It is a secondary route of National Highway 27.  NH-227F runs in the state of Bihar in India.

Route 
NH227F connects Mehsi (Madhuban)  Phulwaria Ghat, Patahi and Bairgania in the state of Bihar.

Junctions  
 
  Terminal near Mehsi.

See also 
 List of National Highways in India
 List of National Highways in India by state

References

External links 

 NH 227F on OpenStreetMap

National highways in India
National Highways in Bihar